Bengal Tiger is a 1936 American drama film directed by Louis King and starring Barton MacLane, June Travis and Warren Hull. The plot closely resembles that of the 1932 film Tiger Shark.

The film's sets were designed by the art director Esdras Hartley.

Plot summary
Cliff Ballenger tries to train a tiger named "Satan" for the circus who is more dangerous than he seems.

Cast

 Barton MacLane as Cliff Ballenger  
 June Travis as Laura Homan Ballenger  
 Warren Hull as Joe Larson  
 Paul Graetz as Carl Homan  
 Joseph Crehan as Bill Hinsdale  
 Dick Purcell as Nick DeLargo  
 Carlyle Moore Jr. as Ambulance Driver 
 John Aasen as Giant   
 Richard Alexander as Strong Man
 Don Barclay as Bit Part 
 Joseph Belmont as Bit Part  
 Glen Cavender as Roustabout 
 Jack A. Goodrich as Jake  
 Sol Gorss as Caster  
 Willard Hall as Announcer  
 Gordon Hart as Hospital Superintendent  
 Jolly Lee Harvey as Fat Woman 
 Jack Holmes as Doctor  
 Stuart Holmes as Ringmaster  
 Clara Horton as Hospital Secretary  
 Milton Kibbee as Clerk  
 Paul Panzer as Train Man  
 Marie Prevost as Saloon Girl  
 'Little Billy' Rhodes as Midget 
 Houseley Stevenson as Justice of the Peace  
 Charlotte V. Sullivan as Midget  
 Lucille Ward as Matron  
 Carol Wines as Saloon Girl 
 Jane Wyman as Saloon Girl

References

Bibliography
 Miller, Don. "B" Movies: An Informal Survey of the American Low-budget Film, 1933-1945. Curtis Books, 1973.

External links
 
 
 
 

1936 films
1936 drama films
American drama films
Films directed by Louis King
Warner Bros. films
American black-and-white films
Films produced by Hal B. Wallis
Circus films
Films about tigers
1930s English-language films
1930s American films